Takashima may refer to:

People with the surname
Gara Takashima (born 1954), Japanese voice actor
Kazusa Takashima, Japanese manga artist
Kōbōyama Daizō, Japanese former sumo wrestler now known as Takashima Oyakata
, Japanese ice hockey player
Masahiro Takashima (born 1965), Japanese actor
Masanobu Takashima (born 1966), Japanese actor, brother of Masahiro
, Japanese women's footballer
Misako Takashima, US comic artist
, Japanese table tennis player
Reiko Takashima (born 1964), Japanese actress
, Japanese sprinter
Shuhan Takashima (1798–1866), 19th-century samurai
Tomonosuke Takashima (1844–1916), Imperial Japanese Army general
Yoshimitsu Takashima (born 1941), Japanese politician

Characters
Laurel Takashima, character in Babylon 5
Takashima, fictional villain in the manga No Need for Tenchi!

Places
 Takashima, Nagasaki (Nishisonogi), town
 Takashima, Nagasaki (Kitamatsuura), town
 Takashima District, Shiga
 Takashima, Shiga, city
 Takashima, Shiga (town)
 Takashima, Shimane, island
 Takashima Station, Okayama, Okayama Prefecture

Japanese-language surnames